Hareb Abdalla Suhail Al-Maazmi (born 26 November 2002) is a professional footballer who plays as a left winger for Shabab Al-Ahli. He is the son of former footballer, Abdullah Suhail.

Career statistic

Club

Notes

International goals

References

External links 
 

2002 births
Living people
Emirati footballers
Association football midfielders
UAE Pro League players
Shabab Al-Ahli Dubai FC
Shabab Al-Ahli Club players